Michael Zohary (born 9 April 1898 in Bóbrka, Galicia (Austria-Hungary); died 16 April 1983 in Israel) was a pioneering Israeli botanist.

Biography
Michael Schein (later Zohary) was born into a Jewish family in Bóbrka, near Lviv (then Austria-Hungarian Empire). He immigrated to the British Mandate for Palestine in 1920. After working building roads, he attended the Teacher's Seminary in Jerusalem. He published the monumental Geobotanical Foundations of the Middle East. He was responsible for introduction of the important principle of antiteleochory which adumbrated that seed germination of the desert plant is ensured by dispersal near the parent plant. His son, Daniel Zohary (1926–2006) was also a highly published botanist specializing in prehistoric plant domestication. 

In 1931, Alexander Eig founded the National Botanic Garden of Israel on Mount Scopus, together with Michael Zohary and Naomi Feinbrun-Dothan.

In 1952 he was appointed professor of botany at the Hebrew University of Jerusalem. 

As well as his interest in the plant geography and vegetation of Israel and Jordan, from 1950–1965 Zohary's research paid special attention to Turkey and Iran. He published The Plant Life of Israel in 1962 and a major article on the vegetation of Iran in the Israel Journal of Botany in 1964. His work on the Flora Palaestina resulted in the publication of the first two volumes, Pteridophyta (1966), and Dialypetalae (1972), meanwhile his major two-volume work, Geobotanical Foundations of the Middle East, appeared in 1973. Zohary's best known work, however, is A New Analytical Flora of Israel (1976, in Hebrew).

Zohary officially retired in 1967, but as Professor Emeritus continued his research, his final book being Plants of the Bible (1982). He died on 15 April 1983 in Jerusalem. 

The plants Anthemis zoharyana  (1938), Bellevalia zoharyi  (1939), and Stachys zoharyana  (1948), are all named after him.

Awards
 In 1954, Zohary was awarded the Israel Prize, for life sciences.

Works
 (published posthumously)
 "The Segetal Plants Communities of Palestine", in: Vegetatio 2 (1950), pp. 387–411
 Flora Palaestina, I–II, Jerusalem 1966–1971
 Plants of the Bible, Cambridge 1982
 Domestication of Plants in the Old World (3rd edition), Oxford 2000
 "The diffusion of South and East Asian and of African crops into the belt of Mediterranean agriculture", in: Plants for Food and Medicine (H.D.V. Prendergast, et al. editors), Royal Botanic Gardens, Kew 1998, pp. 123–134

See also 
List of Israel Prize recipients
List of Galician Jews
List of people from Galicia (modern period)

References

Further reading
Zohary M. Die verbreitungsökologischen Verhältnisse der Pflanzen Palaestinas. Beiheifte zum Botanischen Zentralblatt 61A (1937): 1-155.
Zohary, Michael & Naomi Feinbrun-Dothan. Flora Palaestina. Part 1. Equisetaceae to Moringaceae; Part 2. Platanaceae to Umbelliferae; Part 3. Ericaceae to Compositae. Jerusalem, Academy of Sciences and Letters. 1966-79.  Textvolumes and Plate volumes.
Zohary, Michael. Geobotanical foundations of the Middle East. Stuttgart, G. Fischer, 1973. 2 v. (x, 738 p.) illus. 25 cm.

in memorandum
 Avishai Shmida and David Heller, Michael Zohary - Giant of Israel Botany, in "Israel - Land and Nature" Fall 1983, ppg. 33-35. ISSN 0333-6867

1898 births
1983 deaths
Academic staff of the Hebrew University of Jerusalem
Israeli botanists
Israeli Jews
Israel Prize in life sciences recipients
Israel Prize in life sciences recipients who were botanists
Jews from Galicia (Eastern Europe)
Jews in Mandatory Palestine
Members of the Israel Academy of Sciences and Humanities
Natural history of Israel
Polish emigrants to Mandatory Palestine
Ukrainian Jews